Events in the year 1916 in Germany.

Incumbents

National level
 Kaiser – Wilhelm II
 Chancellor – Theobald von Bethmann Hollweg

State level

Kingdoms
 King of Bavaria – Ludwig III of Bavaria
 King of Prussia – Kaiser Wilhelm II
 King of Saxony – Frederick Augustus III of Saxony
 King of Württemberg – William II of Württemberg

Grand Duchies
 Grand Duke of Baden – Frederick II
 Grand Duke of Hesse – Ernest Louis
 Grand Duke of Mecklenburg-Schwerin – Frederick Francis IV
 Grand Duke of Mecklenburg-Strelitz – Adolphus Frederick VI
 Grand Duke of Oldenburg – Frederick Augustus II
 Grand Duke of Saxe-Weimar-Eisenach – William Ernest

Principalities
 Schaumburg-Lippe – Adolf II, Prince of Schaumburg-Lippe
 Schwarzburg-Rudolstadt – Günther Victor, Prince of Schwarzburg
 Schwarzburg-Sondershausen – Günther Victor, Prince of Schwarzburg
 Principality of Lippe – Leopold IV, Prince of Lippe
 Reuss Elder Line – Heinrich XXIV, Prince Reuss of Greiz (with Heinrich XXVII, Prince Reuss Younger Line, as regent)
 Reuss Younger Line – Heinrich XXVII, Prince Reuss Younger Line
 Waldeck and Pyrmont – Friedrich, Prince of Waldeck and Pyrmont

Duchies
 Duke of Anhalt – Frederick II, Duke of Anhalt
 Duke of Brunswick – Ernest Augustus, Duke of Brunswick
 Duke of Saxe-Altenburg – Ernst II, Duke of Saxe-Altenburg
 Duke of Saxe-Coburg and Gotha – Charles Edward, Duke of Saxe-Coburg and Gotha
 Duke of Saxe-Meiningen – Bernhard III, Duke of Saxe-Meiningen

Colonial Governors
 Cameroon (Kamerun) to 4 March – Karl Ebermaier (2nd and final term) (formally, although territory under British/French occupation)
 German East Africa (Deutsch-Ostafrika) – Albert Heinrich Schnee

Events

4 March – Germany surrenders German Cameroon (Kamerun) to British and French occupying forces.
4 September – Germany surrenders Togoland to British and French occupying forces.

Births

 12 February – Helmut Gröttrup, electrical engineer (died 1981)
 10 May – Alfred Weidenmann, German film director and actor (died 2000)
 9 June – Siegfried Graetschus, SS officer (died (died 1943)
 26 June – Yitzhak Danziger, German-born Israeli sculptor (died 1977)
 20 September – Rudolf August Oetker, German entrepreneur (died 2007)

Deaths

 12 February – Richard Dedekind, mathematician (born 1831)
 4 March – Franz Marc, painter (born 1880)
 11 May:
 Max Reger, Modernist composer, pianist, conductor, writer and professor (born 1873)
 Karl Schwarzschild, Jewish-German physicist (born 1873)
 13 July – Josef Rieder (cyclist)
 11 October – Otto, former King of Bavaria, nobleman (born 1848).
 8 November – Prince Heinrich of Bavaria (born 1884
 4 December – Hans Schilling (aviator), aviator (born 1892
 5 December - Dowager Grand Duchess of Mecklenburg-Strelitz, grandmother of Adolphus Frederick VI, Grand Duke of Mecklenburg-Strelitz (born 1822 in the United Kingdom)
 19 December – Guido Henckel von Donnersmarck, industrialist and nobleman (born 1830)

References

 
Years of the 20th century in Germany
Germany
Germany